A total solar eclipse occurred at the Moon's ascending node of the orbit on Wednesday, October 12, 1977. A solar eclipse occurs when the Moon passes between Earth and the Sun, thereby totally or partly obscuring the image of the Sun for a viewer on Earth. A total solar eclipse occurs when the Moon's apparent diameter is larger than the Sun's, blocking all direct sunlight, turning day into darkness. Totality occurs in a narrow path across Earth's surface, with the partial solar eclipse visible over a surrounding region thousands of kilometres wide. Totality was visible in the Pacific Ocean, Colombia and Venezuela.

Related eclipses

Eclipses in 1977 
 A partial lunar eclipse on Monday, 4 April 1977.
 An annular solar eclipse on Monday, 18 April 1977.
 A penumbral lunar eclipse on Tuesday, 27 September 1977.
 A total solar eclipse on Wednesday, 12 October 1977.

Solar eclipses of 1975–1978

Saros 143

Inex series

Metonic series

Notes

References

1977 10 12
1977 in science
1977 10 12
October 1977 events